The following lists events that happened during 2006 in Benin.

Incumbents
 President: Mathieu Kérékou (until 6 April), Thomas Boni Yayi (starting 6 April)

Events

March
 March 5 - In the 2006 Beninese presidential election, Thomas Boni Yayi is elected for a first term.

References

 
Years of the 21st century in Benin
2000s in Benin
Benin
Benin